Songs to Sweat To is the debut extended play (EP) by Australian electronic music duo Peking Duk, released in the US on 31 July 2015.

Track listing

Release history

References

2015 debut EPs
Peking Duk albums